Sari Marja Hannele Tanus (born February 22, 1964, in Kuopio, Finland), is a Finnish doctor and politician, representing the Christian Democrats in the Parliament of Finland since 2015. She was elected to the Parliament from the Pirkanmaa constituency in the 2015 elections with 2,592 votes.

References

External links
 Home page of Sari Tanus

1964 births
Living people
People from Kuopio
Christian Democrats (Finland) politicians
Members of the Parliament of Finland (2015–19)
Members of the Parliament of Finland (2019–23)
21st-century Finnish women politicians
Women members of the Parliament of Finland